Solidarité Française ("French Solidarity") was a French far-right league founded in 1933 by perfume manufacturer François Coty (1874-1934)  as  a "Parti national corporatif républicain".

After Coty's death, it was commanded by Major Jean Renaud, members dressed in blue shirts, black berets, and jackboots, and shouted the slogan "France for the French".

The movement claimed a strength of 180,000 in 1934, with 80,000 in Paris; the Parisian police thought the number in Paris closer to 15,000. The small membership did not however isolate the group: the Solidarité Française found itself integrated in the loose coalition of far right movements such as Action Française and Pierre Taittinger's Jeunesse Patriotes.

The group gained notoriety during the rally and later riot during the 6 February 1934 crisis, in front of the Parliament seat in the Palais Bourbon. It was dissolved by a law adopted by the Popular Front government of Léon Blum in June 1936. Many members of Solidarité Française subsequently joined Jacques Doriot's fascist Parti Populaire Français (PPF).

See also 
6 February 1934 crisis

References 

1933 establishments in France
1936 disestablishments in France
French far right leagues
Clothing in politics